San Vito di Leguzzano is a town in the province of Vicenza, Veneto, Italy. It is west of SP46 road.

Sights include the parish church of Sts. Vitus, Modestus and Crescentia and the 16th century church of St. Valentino.

References

External links
(Google Maps)

Cities and towns in Veneto